Portazgo is a station on Line 1 of the Madrid Metro. It is located in fare Zone A, and has been open to the public since 7 March 1962.

References 

Line 1 (Madrid Metro) stations
Railway stations in Spain opened in 1962
Buildings and structures in Puente de Vallecas District, Madrid